National Lampoon Presents French Comics (The Kind Men Like) is an American humor book first published in 1977 in hardcover. It was a spin-off of National Lampoon magazine. The book is a collection of translated comics by French  comic book artists and cartoonists of the 1970s, including Gérard Lauzier, Moebius (Jean Giraud), Guido Buzzelli, Nikita Mandryka, Sole, Lozo, Jean-Claude Forest,  Alexis, and Gotlib. The words were translated by Sophie Balcoff, Valerie Marchant, and Sean Kelly. Peter Kaminsky was the editor.

References

 Amazon listing
 Amazon image of the cover
 Listed here

French Comics
1977 books